David K. Arterburn (born June 13, 1957) is a Judge of the Nebraska Court of Appeals.

Education

He received an Associate of Arts degree from York College in 1977. He received a Bachelor of Arts in 1978 and a Master of Arts in 1982 both from the University of Nebraska-Lincoln. He received his Juris Doctor from the University of Nebraska College of Law in 1985.

Legal career

He served as an Assistant United States Attorney in the United States District of Nebraska and the Nebraska Attorney's office.

State court service

Arterburn was one of nine people who submitted their name for a vacancy as a district judge of the 2nd Judicial District. He later served as judge of that court from 2005 to his appointment to the Court of Appeals.

Nebraska Court of Appeals service

In December 2016 Governor Pete Ricketts appointed Arterburn to the Court of Appeals to the seat vacated by the retirement of Judge John Irwin. A formal investiture ceremony was held on February 10, 2017.

References

External links

Official Biography on Nebraska Judicial Branch website

Living people
1957 births
Assistant United States Attorneys
Nebraska lawyers
Nebraska state court judges
University of Nebraska–Lincoln alumni
20th-century American lawyers
21st-century American judges
York University (Nebraska) alumni